Albert Ervine Swift (July 1, 1915 - June 21, 2003) was a bishop of the Episcopal Church in the United States of America.

Biography
Swift was born on July 1, 1915, in Claremore, Oklahoma, the son of Albert Aaron Swift and Margarette Anna Clarkson. he studied at the University of Oklahoma and later at the Episcopal Divinity School. After ordination, he became assistant secretary and acting executive of the Oversees department of the National Council. Later he also served as a faculty member of the St. John's University, Shanghai. He was also assistant priest at St Hilda's Refugee Camp in the Wuchang District. In 1948 he became rector of Trinity Church in Manila in the Philippines and subsequently chaplain of St Luke's Hospital. He also served as acting dean of St Andrew's Theological Seminary in Quezon City.

In 1950 he was elected Bishop of Puerto Rico and was consecrated on May 3, 1951, by Presiding Bishop Henry Knox Sherrill in Grace Episcopal Cathedral (Topeka, Kansas). He retained the post until his resignation on August 1, 1965, to give way for a native bishop to take charge. Bishop Swift assisted with the Confirmations and Ordinations in Puerto Rico until January 1967. He was also responsible, for a time, of the missionary district of Honduras. He also served as Assistant Bishop of Southeast Florida and rector of St Gregory's Church in Boca Raton, Florida. In 1974 he was appointed Bishop-in-Charge of the Convocation of American Churches in Europe, which post he commenced on July 1 of the same year.

External links 
Ervine Swift, Episcopalian Bishop
Grave

1915 births
2003 deaths
People from Claremore, Oklahoma
University of Oklahoma alumni
Episcopal Divinity School alumni
Academic staff of St. John's University, Shanghai
20th-century American Episcopalians
American expatriate bishops
American expatriates in the Philippines
American expatriates in China
Episcopal bishops of Puerto Rico
20th-century American clergy